Lee Morris is a former wide receiver in the National Football League. He played for the Green Bay Packers during the 1987 NFL season.

References

1964 births
Living people
American football wide receivers
Green Bay Packers players
Oklahoma Sooners football players
Sportspeople from Oklahoma City
San Antonio Riders players
National Football League replacement players